A geek is a slang term for an odd person. 

Geek or GEEK may also refer to:

Arts, entertainment, and media

Films
 Geeks (2004 film), a 2004 film
 The Geek, a 1971 pornographic horror film

Music
 Geek!, the first EP by My Bloody Valentine
 Geeks (musical duo), a K-pop and Korean hiphop duo
 The Geeks (band), a South Korean punk band

Books 
Geek Love, a 1989 novel by Katherine Dunn

Other uses
 Geek, a human who bites the heads off of small animals as in a geek show
Geek Squad, the technical support subsidiary of Best Buy
Geek.com, a Weblog site

See also
 Geake, a surname
Nerd (disambiguation)